Anything for a Thrill is a 1937 American crime film directed by Leslie Goodwins and written by Joseph O'Donnell and Stanley Lowenstein. The film stars Frankie Darro, Kane Richmond, June Johnson, Ann Evers, Johnstone White and Horace Murphy. The film was released on June 15, 1937, by Conn Pictures Corporation.

Plot

Cast          
Frankie Darro as Dan Mallory
Kane Richmond as Cliff Mallory
June Johnson as Jean Roberts
Ann Evers as Betty Kelley
Johnstone White as Burke 
Horace Murphy as Mr. Kelley
Edward Hearn as Collins
Frank Marlowe as Joe
Bob Kortman as Henchman
Charles Dorety as Charlie 
Charles McAvoy as Guard

References

External links
 

1937 films
American crime films
1937 crime films
Films directed by Leslie Goodwins
American black-and-white films
1930s English-language films
1930s American films